CCGS Earl Grey is a   light icebreaker and buoy tender in the Canadian Coast Guard. Constructed in  1986, the vessel serves a variety of roles, including light ice-breaking and buoy tending, as well as being strengthened for navigation in ice to perform tasking along the shores off the Atlantic coast of Canada. Like her sister ship, she carries a large and powerful crane on her long low afterdeck for manipulating buoys. Earl Grey is the second icebreaker in Canadian service to carry the name.

Design and description
The design of the vessel is based on offshore supply-tugboat designs, with strengthened chines. The vessel has a tall foredeck, and a long low quarterdeck, for carrying buoys, where a crane with a capability of lifting  is permanently mounted. The crane is motion stabilized.

The ship is powered by four Deutz 4SA 9-cylinder diesel-electric engines driving two controllable pitch propellers that create . The ship is equipped with one Caterpillar 3306 emergency generator.

The vessel is equipped with two Racal Decca navigational radars using the I band. The vessel has a complement of 24, with 9 officers and 15 crew.

Career
Ordered in 1983, the ship was constructed by Pictou Shipyard Ltd at their yard in Pictou, Nova Scotia with the yard number 218. The vessel was completed on 30 May 1986. The vessel is registered in Ottawa, Ontario and home ported at Charlottetown, Prince Edward Island.

The ship took part in fall 1998 in assisting in the recovery of wreckage from the crash of Swissair Flight 111. Earl Grey was among the units dispatched to search for survivors, but they failed to find any. In 1996, the ship assisted in the recovery and raising of the wrecked oil barge Irving Whale which had been carrying bunker oil that had been salvaged from another sunken ship from the sea floor.

On 21 March 2001, CCGS Earl Grey,  and the commercial oceangoing salvage tugboat Ryan Leet all tried to render assistance to the container ship  which had caught fire off Chebucto Head. In the 2009 budget for the Department of Fisheries and Oceans, the Canadian Coast Guard, requested funds to refit Earl Grey and some of the CCG's other large vessels. The contract to refit Earl Grey was awarded to Davie Shipbuilding, announced on 12 March 2015. In January 2017 Earl Grey was sent to monitor the tanker Arca 1 which ran aground off the coast of Nova Scotia.

Predecessor

In 1909 the Government of Canada ordered an icebreaking passenger steamship for service in the Northumberland Strait to connect the ports of Charlottetown and Georgetown on Prince Edward Island with the mainland port of Pictou.  She was commissioned in 1910 by then Governor General, Albert Grey as CGS Earl Grey (Canadian Government Ship Earl Grey).  She was sold in 1914 to Imperial Russia, an ally during World War I. The ship, christened Kanada and later Fyodor Litke, operated in the Arctic until 1958.

References

Notes

Citations

Sources

External links
 

Samuel Risley-class light icebreakers
Ships built in Nova Scotia
1986 ships